Novae Group plc is an insurance underwriting company headquartered in London. John Hastings-Bass is the company's chairman and Matthew Fosh is the chief executive. The Company was founded in 1986 as SVB Holdings plc and changed its name to Novae Group plc in 2006.

In July 2017, the company was acquired by AXIS Capital for $604 million.

References

External links
 Official site

Insurance companies of the United Kingdom
Financial services companies established in 2006